Roman J. Israel, Esq. is a 2017 American legal drama film written and directed by Dan Gilroy. The film stars Denzel Washington and Colin Farrell and follows the life of a civil rights advocate and defense lawyer (Washington) who finds himself in a tumultuous series of events that lead to a personal crisis and the necessity for extreme action.

The project was announced on August 25, 2016, as Gilroy's next directorial effort titled Inner City, but was renamed on June 22, 2017. Principal photography began in March 2017 and took place in Los Angeles and Santa Clarita, California.

Roman J. Israel, Esq. premiered at the 2017 Toronto International Film Festival on September 9, 2017, and was theatrically released in the United States by Sony Pictures Releasing on November 17, 2017. The film grossed just $13 million against its $22 million budget and received mixed reviews from critics. For his performance, Washington was nominated for the Academy Award, the Golden Globe, and the Screen Actors Guild Award.

Plot
Roman J. Israel is a lawyer earning $500 a week at a small law firm in Los Angeles. In his two-partner office, Israel is responsible for preparing briefs, often focusing on the civil rights of their defendants, while William Jackson, the firm's founder and a well-respected professor, focuses on the courtroom appearances that Israel struggles with. Israel has spent years developing a brief that he believes will bring reform to the unfair use of plea bargaining to induce guilty pleas in the justice system. Though short on social skills, Israel is gifted with a phenomenal memory as well as strong personal convictions, which he has pursued at the expense of family.

Jackson suffers a fatal heart attack. The firm is broke and will close, all to be handled by Jackson's former student, George Pierce. Pierce, who greatly admired Jackson and is impressed by Israel's legal mind, offers a job at his own large firm. Israel initially rejects this offer, believing that Pierce is simply a greedy lawyer. Israel meets Maya during a job interview at a local activist network. The interview does not go well, but Maya asks him to speak at an upcoming meeting organizing a protest. Struggling to find a job elsewhere, Israel reluctantly takes up Pierce's job offer.

Israel is a poor fit at his new firm, clashing with senior partner Jesse Salinas over a joke Salinas makes about battered women. After attempting to interest Pierce in his brief, Israel is disappointed to be assigned to handle clients. One such client is Derrell Ellerbee, a young man arrested for murder, who tells Israel that he is willing to divulge the whereabouts of the actual shooter, Carter "CJ" Johnson, and will testify against him. Israel goes behind Pierce's back to negotiate a plea deal with the district attorney. The prosecutor rejects his offer and hangs up on Israel after he insults her unsympathetic counter-offer. As a consequence, Ellerbee is also denied the protective custody he begged for in prison and is murdered as a snitch.

On the same evening, Israel is berated by Pierce for mishandling of Ellerbee's case, then is mugged by a homeless man he attempted to help. He becomes downcast and cynical, illegally using the information he received from Ellerbee to anonymously collect the $100,000 reward for Johnson's location. Israel indulges in luxuries he had previously eschewed. Pierce apologizes to Israel for berating him earlier and for forcing him out of the shadows, accepting that he thrives working behind the scenes as he did at his old firm. Maya calls Israel to ask him out on a date, where she shares some of her struggles with idealism and thanks Israel for his inspiring her. Pierce invites Israel to a luxury box, where he shares some of his big plans for their future at the firm.

Pierce calls Israel to meet a new client arrested for murder. Before the meeting, Pierce resumes the conversation from the game stating that Israel's dedication to justice has touched him, and that he is reorganizing the firm to take on pro bono cases handled by Israel. Pierce offers to work with Israel on his brief. Israel, still a bit despondent, is unmoved by these developments. They go in to see the client, who turns out to be Johnson. Meeting Israel in jail, Johnson accuses him of divulging privileged communications to collect the reward money, and resolves to torment Israel with the threat of jail time or death. Israel suffers a breakdown in which he becomes a law unto himself becoming both the lawyer and the defendant in one and judges his own actions as unlawful. Renouncing his momentary transgression, Israel goes home and returns the reward money with a note apologizing for taking it in the first place. He reconciles with Maya and Pierce, and tries to motivate them to pursue their inner sense of justice. He tells Pierce that he is turning himself in to the police for his crime. As Israel starts walking to a nearby station, he is shot and killed by one of Johnson's henchmen.

In the aftermath, Maya is seen to be renewed in her activism efforts, while Pierce files Israel's brief, in both their names, intent on continuing his efforts to reform the justice system.

Cast
 Denzel Washington as Roman J. Israel
 Colin Farrell as George Pierce
 Carmen Ejogo as Maya Alston
 Shelley Hennig as Olivia Reed
 Lynda Gravatt as Vernita Wells
 Amanda Warren as Lynn Jackson (niece)
 Hugo Armstrong as Fritz Molinar
 Sam Gilroy as Connor Novick
 Tony Plana as Jesse Salinas
 DeRon Horton as Derrell Ellerbee
 Amari Cheatom as Carter Johnson
 Nazneen Contractor as Assistant D.A. Melina Nassour
 Joseph David-Jones as Marcus Jones
 Henry G. Sanders as Pastor Jack

Production
On August 25, 2016, it was revealed that Dan Gilroy's next directorial project was Inner City, a legal drama in the vein of The Verdict. Gilroy was then courting Denzel Washington to star. It was reported on September 21, 2016 that Sony Pictures was closing a deal to distribute the film, with principal photography scheduled to begin in March 2017. Gilroy's collaborators on Nightcrawler, cinematographer Robert Elswit and editor John Gilroy, worked with him again on the project. On January 31, 2017, it was reported that Colin Farrell was in talks to join the cast. As of February 28, 2017, Ashton Sanders was in talks to join as well, though he was unable to because of scheduling conflicts. In April 2017, Nazneen Contractor and Joseph David-Jones joined the cast. As of April 21, 2017, Inner City had begun filming in Los Angeles. In June 2017, Carmen Ejogo joined the cast as a civil rights worker. On June 22, 2017, the film was renamed Roman J. Israel, Esq.

Music
James Newton Howard composed the film's music, as he previously worked with Gilroy in Nightcrawler. The score is now released at Sony Classical.

Release
The film had its world premiere at the Toronto International Film Festival on September 10, 2017, before its commercial release on November 17, 2017, initially limited, by Sony Pictures Releasing. Following its festival premiere, the film was re-edited to tighten its pacing, with a dozen minutes (including one whole subplot) being shaved off the final runtime, and a key scene regarding Colin Farrell's character being shifted from the third act to earlier in the film.

Reception

Box office
Roman J. Israel, Esq. grossed $12 million in the United States and Canada, and $1.1 million in other territories, for a worldwide total of $13 million.

Released alongside Justice League, The Star and Wonder on November 17, 2017. The film grossed $61,999 from four theaters in its limited opening weekend, for a per-venue average of $15,500. It then expanded to 1,648 theaters the following Wednesday, alongside the openings of Coco and The Man Who Invented Christmas. It went on to gross at $4.5 million over the three-day weekend (and $6.2 million over the five), finishing 9th at the box office. It fell 57% in its second weekend to $1.9 million.

Critical response 
On Rotten Tomatoes, the film has an approval rating of 54% based on 177 reviews, with an average rating of 5.80/10. The website's critical consensus reads, "Intriguing yet heavy-handed, Roman J. Israel, Esq. makes the most of — but never quite lives up to — Denzel Washington's magnetic performance in the title role." On Metacritic, which assigns a normalized rating to reviews, the film has a weighted average score 58 out of 100, based 41 critics, indicating "mixed or average reviews". Audiences polled by CinemaScore gave the film an average grade of "B" on an A+ to F scale.

Writing for Rolling Stone, Peter Travers gave the film 3 out of 4 stars, praising Washington and writing, "In no way is his performance a stunt. Washington digs so deep under the skin of this complex character that we almost breathe with him. It's a great, award-caliber performance in a movie that can barely contain it." Richard Roeper of the Chicago Sun-Times gave the film 2 out of 4 stars. He also highlighted Washington, but criticized the narrative, saying, "Roman J. Israel, Esq. has pockets of intrigue, and writer-director Gilroy and Washington have teamed up to create a promising dramatic character. We just never get full delivery on that promise."

In his review for Empire, Simon Braund summarized the political motives in the film viewed as a legal thriller stating, "It (Roman's idealism) illustrates succinctly how at odds with the modern world Roman Israel is. A brilliant legal mind, trapped in the body of a twitchy social misfit, he has all the hallmarks of a true genius-savant — the interpersonal skills of a yeast cell, dress sense of an Open University lecturer circa 1973 and an unshakeable conviction that justice for the poor and dispossessed is a cause worth fighting for. To this deeply unfashionable end, he’s spent decades toiling in the shadows at a tiny law firm, making trouble for The Man while compiling a vast, unwieldy brief he hopes will, one day, set the American legal system on its ear". 
Owen Gleiberman of Variety wrote: "It leaves us with a character you won’t soon forget, but you wish that the movie were as haunting as he is."

Accolades

References

External links
 
 

2010s legal drama films
Cross Creek Pictures films
Columbia Pictures films
Escape Artists films
Topic Studios films
Films directed by Dan Gilroy
Films with screenplays by Dan Gilroy
Films produced by Denzel Washington
Films scored by James Newton Howard
American legal drama films
Films set in Los Angeles
2017 drama films
2010s English-language films
2010s American films